The Syndicate is a British game show that aired on BBC One from 26 June to 15 September 2000 and was hosted by Nick Ross. It was seen as the BBC's attempt to rival ITV's Who Wants to Be a Millionaire?.

Mark Labbett, who is now known for being a Chaser on The Chase, appeared on this show.

References

External links

BBC television game shows
2000s British game shows
2000 British television series debuts
2000 British television series endings